Robert, Rob or Bob Delaney may refer to:

Robert Delaney (cat burglar) (died 1948), British criminal
Robert Delaney (composer) (1903–1956), American composer
Rob Delaney (born 1977), American comedian, writer, and actor
Rob Delaney (baseball) (born 1984), baseball player and coach
Bob Delaney (politician) (born 1953), Ontario politician
Bob Delaney (basketball) (born 1951), American NBA referee
Bob DeLaney (sportscaster) (1924–2008), American radio commentator

See also
Delany (disambiguation)
Robert Delannoy (fl. 1910s), World War I flying ace